The 1990 Individual Speedway Junior World Championship was the 14th edition of the World motorcycle speedway Under-21 Championships. The event was won by Chris Louis of England.

World final
September 9, 1990
 Lviv, Stadium Ska

References

1990
Individual Speedway
Individual Speedway
Speedway competitions in Ukraine